The Trade Act of 2002 (U.S. Trade Promotion Authority Act) granted the President of the United States the authority to negotiate trade deals with other countries and gives Congress the approval to only vote up or down on the agreement, not to amend it. This authority is sometimes called fast-track authority, since it is thought to streamline approval of trade agreements. This authority makes it easier to negotiate deals, which engenders both support and opposition, opposition coming from labor and environmental groups.

The last time the President was granted fast-track authority was to negotiate the Uruguay Round Agreement of the World Trade Organization. The Uruguay Round was completed just as fast-track authority expired in 1994. The President went without the authority until it was renewed in 2002. The trade promotion authority expired in July 2007 (except for agreements already under negotiation), but was granted again by the Bipartisan Congressional Trade Priorities and Accountability Act of 2015.

See also
 Fast track (trade) for detailed history

External links
 
 

United States federal trade legislation
Acts of the 107th United States Congress
2002 in international relations